Henry Charles Lopes, 1st Baron Ludlow,  (3 October 1828 – 25 December 1899) was a British judge and Conservative Party politician.

Background and education
Ludlow was a younger son of Sir Ralph Lopes, 2nd Baronet, and the uncle of Henry Lopes, 1st Baron Roborough. He was educated at Winchester and Balliol College, Oxford, and was called to the Bar, Inner Temple, in 1852.

Political and legal career

Ludlow sat as Member of Parliament for Launceston from 1868 to 1874 and for Frome from 1874 to 1876. He was also a Recorder of Exeter from 1867 to 1876 and became a Queen's Counsel in 1868.

In 1876, he was appointed a Justice of the Common Pleas Division of the High Court of Justice, a post he held until 1880, and then served as a Lord Justice of Appeal from 1885 to 1897.

Lopes was knighted in 1876 and sworn of the Privy Council in 1885. In 1897, he was raised to the peerage as Baron Ludlow, of Heywood in the County of Wiltshire.

Judgments
Learoyd v Whiteley [1887] UKHL 1, (1887) 12 AC 727 - (Lopes concurring with Cotton LF and Lindley LF in the Court of Appeal) - the House of Lords affirmed the Court of Appeal decision in this English trusts law case concerning the duty of care owed by a trustee when exercising the power of investment.
British South Africa Co v Companhia de Moçambique [1893] AC 602 (Lopes sitting in the Court of Appeal) - the House of Lords overturned Lopes' Court of Appeal decision and by so doing established the Mozambique rule, a common law rule in private international law that renders actions relating to title in foreign land, the right to possession of foreign land, and trespass to foreign land non-justiciable in common law jurisdictions.
The Satanita [1897] AC 59 - Contract law case atypical of the conventional offer & acceptance pattern seen in English law. Lopes decision at appeal affirmed by the House of Lords.

Family
Lord Ludlow married Cordelia Lucy, daughter of Erving Clark, in 1854. They had one son and five daughters.

Hon. Susan Ludlow Cordelia Lopes (30 Jun 1858 – 20 Apr 1938), who married Archibald Bence-Jones (1857-1937). They had one daughter.
Hon. Cordelia Lucy Lopes (1861 - 18 Apr 1945). She married Sir John Alexander Hanham, 9th Baronet. They had two sons, and a daughter.
Hon. Ethel Maud Lopes (27 Oct 1863 - 11 Dec 1943). Unmarried.
Henry Ludlow Lopes, 2nd Baron Ludlow (30 Sep 1865 – 8 Nov 1922). Married twice, but died without issue.
Hon. Ernestine Frances Lopes (13 Aug 1868 - 2 Sep 1938). She married George Lopes (28 Apr 1857 - 3 Oct 1909) in 1897.
Hon. Bertha Susan Lopes (1869 - 6 May 1926), married Charles Bathurst, 1st Viscount Bledisloe. They had two sons, and a daughter.

Cordelia died in 1891. Lord Ludlow survived her by eight years and died in December 1899, aged 71. 
He was succeeded by his only son, Henry.

References

External links 

 
 

1828 births
1899 deaths
Barons in the Peerage of the United Kingdom
Lopes, Henry
Lords Justices of Appeal
Conservative Party (UK) MPs for English constituencies
UK MPs 1868–1874
UK MPs 1874–1880
UK MPs who were granted peerages
Members of the Parliament of the United Kingdom for Launceston
Henry
English people of Portuguese-Jewish descent
Jewish British politicians
Members of the Privy Council of the United Kingdom
Knights Bachelor
Common Pleas Division judges
Queen's Bench Division judges
Peers of the United Kingdom created by Queen Victoria